Michelle "Shelly" Altman is an American soap opera writer who is known as breakdown and associate head writer of numerous American daytime soap operas, including Another World, General Hospital and One Life to Live.

Career
In 1987, Altman co-wrote a screenplay for Sweet Lorraine. From 1995 to 1999, Altman and Jean Passanante were associate head writers of Another World and from 1999 to 2011 held the same position while doing One Life to Live. From 2013 to 2015 Altman was a co-head writer of The Young and the Restless along with Jean Passanante. In 2015, Altman and Passanante replaced Ron Carlivati, who was the head writer of General Hospital since 2012. Altman had been the show's associate head co-writer since 2011, prior to which she was its breakdown writer.

Awards and nominations
Daytime Emmy Awards

Win
(2008; Best Writing; One Life To Live) 
(2014; Best Writing; The Young and the Restless)

Nominations
(1996; Best Writing; Another World)
(2002, 2006, 2009; Best Writing; One Life To Live)
(2012, 2013; Best Writing; General Hospital)

Writers Guild of America Award

Win
(2016; Best Writing; General Hospital)

Nominations
(2003 and 2005 season; One Life To Live)
(1997 season; Another World)

HW history

References

American soap opera writers
Daytime Emmy Award winners
Year of birth missing (living people)
Living people